"In Dreams" is the twelfth episode of the sixth season of the post-apocalyptic horror television series Fear the Walking Dead, the 81st episode overall,  "In Dreams" was released on the streaming platform AMC+ on May 7, 2021, in the United States and aired on television on AMC two days later, on May 9, 2021.

Grace wakes up in what appears to be a dream-like state with a case of amnesia. Seeing what's become of her friends after she has been gone for years, Grace struggles to put the pieces of the past together on what has transpired since she has been gone.

Plot 
Sixteen years have passed in a supposed future, Grace wakes up to discover that she had died giving birth to her daughter Athena and that all of her friends have prospered. Traveling with Athena, Grace notices inconsistencies in the world and realizes that she is actually unconscious and dreams after an explosion caused by Riley and the Doomsday Cult seeking the mysterious key that Morgan had taken from Emile, Pursued by cultists, Grace makes her way through her dream world, bonding with her daughter and evading Riley's forces, convinced that she needs to awaken to give birth to Athena, but that she will not survive.

In the real world, Morgan takes refuge with Grace in a vet's office and stables, killing Riley's men and forcing Riley to flee. When her heart stops in the real world, Grace says goodbye to Morgan and Athena and walks into the light only to revive in the real world. Riley returns and demands the key at gunpoint and Grace has Morgan give it to her, convinced by her dream that her daughter will bring everyone together and it won't matter. Grace gives birth to Athena, but Grace and Morgan are devastated when Athena is stillborn due to the absorption of deadly radiation into her mother's body.

Reception

Critical reception 
Paul Daily of TV Fanatic rated the episode 3.5 out of 5 and praised Grace's development and Karen David's performance, adding "I've always had this feeling the rug was going to be pulled out from under us to reveal that she's been working with this new group all along.". Emily Hannemann of TV Insider gave the episode 5 out of 5 stars, writing " 'In Dreams' is among the show’s best installments, anchored by strong performances and a tragic twist." Ray Flook of Bleeding Cool also praised the episode, saying "it was a very touching and heartbreaking tale of the sacrifices a mother is willing to make for her daughter- and in this case, vice-versa."

David S.E. Zapanta from Den of Geek! rated it of 2.5 out of 5 and wrote: "By the end of the season, I expect we’ll find out what “the cost of peace” really means for our survivors. Erik Kain of Forbes expressed a mixed view of the episode as well, writing, "Fear The Walking Dead takes a somewhat surreal approach to Sunday night’s episode, “In Dreams.” For better or worse. It also goes very dark, with a tragedy tailor-made for Mother's Day. Fun times".

Ratings 
The episode was seen by 0.99 million viewers in the United States on its original air date, below the previous episodes, being one of the lowest audiences.

References

External links

 "In Dreams" at AMC.com
 

2021 American television episodes
Fear the Walking Dead (season 6) episodes